Raquel Anderson (born 2 November 1991) is a New Zealand rugby league footballer who played for the New Zealand Warriors in the NRL Women's Premiership.

Playing career
A Manurewa Marlins junior, Anderson made her debut for New Zealand in their 2017 Women's Rugby League World Cup warm-up match against the Maori Wahine Toa. In November 2017, she represented New Zealand at the World Cup, playing two games.

In 2018, she joined the New Zealand Warriors NRL Women's Premiership team. In Round 2 of the 2018 NRL Women's premiership, she made her debut for the Warriors, scoring a try in a 10–22 loss to the St George Illawarra Dragons.

On 22 June 2019, she came off the bench in New Zealand's 46–8 win over Samoa at Mt Smart Stadium.

References 

1991 births
Living people
New Zealand female rugby league players
New Zealand women's national rugby league team players
Rugby league halfbacks
Rugby league hookers
New Zealand Warriors (NRLW) players